The tenth season of the Argentine version of the television reality show Gran Hermano was announced on 21 June 2022 by Telefe. After last airing on América TV in 2016, the show made its return to the original network Telefe, and it would be the first series to air in the network since the seventh season that aired during 2011–2012.

Santiago del Moro was formally announced as the show's new host. The show follows a group of contestants (known as HouseGuests), who live in a house together while being constantly filmed and having no communication with the outside world as they compete to win a grand prize of ARS15 million and a house. The runner-up also wins a house. Each week, the HouseGuests compete in a Head of Household (HoH) competition which gives them immunity from nominations and the power to save one of the nominees up for eviction. 
On eviction night, the audience votes to evict one of the nominees.

The season premiered on 17 October 2022, and is expected to run for 161 days, with the season ending on 27 March 2023.

Format
The show follows a group of contestants, known as HouseGuests, who live inside a custom-built house outfitted with cameras and microphones recording their every move 24 hours a day. The HouseGuests are sequestered with no contact with the outside world. During their stay, the HouseGuests share their thoughts on their day-to-day lives inside the house in a private room known as the Diary Room. Each week, the HouseGuests compete in competitions in order to win power and safety inside the house. At the start of each week, the HouseGuests compete in a Head of Household (abbreviated as "HOH") competition. The winner of the HoH competition is immune from eviction and selects another HouseGuest to be saved for eviction. On eviction night, the audience vote to evict one of the nominees, and the nominee with the most votes is evicted from the house.

HouseGuests
A total of 18 HouseGuests moved into the house on Day 1 (17 October 2022), with the last two new HouseGuests moving into the house on Day 60 (15 December 2022). Former evicted HouseGuest Juliana Díaz returned to the house on Day 66 (21 December 2022), and other three evicted HouseGuests (Agustín, Daniela and Lucila) returned on Day 71 (26 December 2022).

Relatives
On Day 127 (20 February 2023), relatives from each one of the six remaining HouseGuests that were in competition at the time entered the house.

Episodes

Voting history

HouseGuests nominate for two and one points, shown in descending order in the nomination box. The four or more HouseGuests with the most nomination points face the public vote.

HouseGuests can also use the Diary Room's Special Nomination, which gives three and two points instead. HouseGuests that use the Special Nomination are marked in orange.

From Weeks 14 through 20, the Power Nomination (fulminante in Spanish) was enabled by Gran Hermano, which consists of the automatic nomination of a HouseGuest, without the ability to be saved by the Head of Household. It could only be used once by each contestant throughout those weeks. HouseGuests that use the Power Nomination are marked in bold.

Notes

Production

Development
Gran Hermano 2022 is co-produced by production companies Kuarzo Entertainment Argentina and Banijay. The season was first confirmed on June 21, 2022. New host Santiago del Moro was also confirmed for the season. Casting for the season started in 21 June 2022, and concluded sometime around October 2022 with open-call auditions held for people between 18–101 years old. Applicants had to upload a presentation video and show their social networks.

Prize
The winner of the series, determined by the audience, wins ARS15 million and a house, while the runner-up wins a house.

Production design

The house is located in a new location in Martínez, Buenos Aires. As with previous seasons, the house is outfitted with 65 cameras and 87 microphones. With over 2,500 square metres, it would become the biggest house ever of Gran Hermano Argentina, including 1,200 m2 indoors, 400 m2 outdoors, a supermarket, and the "arena" in which the HouseGuests are expected to compete for games and challenges.

Release
The premiere of the tenth season of Gran Hermano was broadcast on Telefe, YouTube and Twitch on 17 October 2022. The telecast received a 21.46/65 rating/share, becoming the highest premiere of any show for the 2022 season in Argentina. During the premiere on YouTube, the broadcasting reached 49,000 live users, while on Twitch the stream gained over 31,500 viewers.

The season is scheduled to air from Sundays through Fridays on Telefe, with nomination galas on Wednesdays, eviction galas on Sundays, debates on Mondays, Tuesdays and Thursdays, and a special edition called Night with the Exes (La Noche de los Ex in Spanish) with former HouseGuests from previous seasons on Fridays. The debates are joined by panelists Sol Pérez, Nati Jota, Laura Ubfal, Gastón Trezeguet, Ceferino Reato, Cristian Urrizaga and Analía Franchín, while the Night of the Exs being hosted by Roberto Funes Ugarte.

Paramount's video streaming service Pluto TV was chosen to offer a 24-hour live feed of the house on channel 141.

Reception

Viewing figures

Debate episodes

Night of the Exes episodes

Pluto TV Presents: Spying the House episodes

Episodes 1–100

Episodes 101–200

Episodes 201–present

Notes

References

External links
  – official website

Gran Hermano (Argentine TV series) seasons
2022 television seasons